Fantasy Advertiser, later abbreviated to FA, was a British fanzine focused on comic books, founded in 1965 by Frank Dobson, the "Godfather of British Fandom." Starting out as an adzine focused on the sale of primarily second-hand comics, it eventually transitioned into a true comics fanzine. FA now operates as a comics webzine.

Publication history

1965–1979: Dodson/Skinn/McCartney era 
Frank Dobson established Fantasy Advertiser as an adzine — essentially an advertising service for comic collectors. Dobson published 31 issues of Fantasy Advertiser, but when he emigrated to Australia in 1970 he handed the zine on to two contributors, Dez Skinn and Paul McCartney, to continue. (Dodson, meanwhile, returned from Australia and opened a comics retailing location, Weird Fantasy Bookshop, on Lewisham Way in New Cross.)

Skinn and McCartney expanded the magazine to include more articles and artwork. Regular contributors included Dave Gibbons, Steve Parkhouse, Paul Neary, Jim Baikie, and Kevin O'Neill. Skinn left in 1976, at which point it was taken over by retailer/distributor Colin Campbell, who edited FA until 1978. Dobson returned to publish five more issues in 1978–1979, when the fanzine went dormant.

1981–1988: Lock/Skidmore era 
After two years of dormancy, Fantasy Advertiser was revived in late 1981 by Martin Lock, fresh off publishing his long-running fanzine BEM. Lock incorporated the "BEM News Service" comic industry news feature into Fantasy Advertiser, as well as two other fanzines: Mike Taylor's Masters of Infinity and Colin Gould's Ogre. 

In 1985, after four years overseeing FA, Lock handed over the editorial reins to Martin Skidmore so Lock could focus on his next venture, the publishing company Harrier Comics.

Skidmore shortened the name to FA — he didn't want it to "sound like a sexual contacts mag," and wanted to move away from the equation of comics with fantasy, expanding coverage of different genres. Skidmore made the magazine more provocative and political.

Fantasy Advertiser won the 1985 Eagle Award for Favourite Specialist Comics Publication/Trade Publication—UK.

1988–1991: Neptune era 
With issue #100 (March 1988), FA was taken over by Neptune Distribution; with issue #108 (Nov. 1998), FA began to be published by Neptune's comics division, Trident Comics. The final monthly issue of FA was #114, dated October 1989; its final published issue was #115, released in 1991. Trident went under in 1992 when its parent company, Neptune Distribution, was acquired by Diamond Comics Distributors.

2010: Online relaunch 
In October 2010 Skidmore relaunched FA as an online zine, including reviews, articles, interviews and original comics. FA is now published by Tony Keen, Andrew Moreton, and Will Morgan.

Editors 
 Frank Dobson — issues #1–31 (1965–1970)
 Dez Skinn (with Paul McCartney) — issues #32–58 (1970–1976)
 Colin Campbell — issues #59–64 (1976–1977)
 Frank Dobson — issue #65–69 (1978–June 1979)
 Martin Lock — issues #70–89 (Nov. 1981–1984)
 Martin Skidmore — issues #90-115 (1985–1991)

Awards
 1977 Eagle Award nomination for Favourite British Fan Publication
 1978 Eagle Award nomination for Favourite Fan Publication
 1985 Eagle Award for Favourite Speciality Comics Publication
 1986 Eagle Award nomination for Favourite Specialist Comics Publication

See also 
 Speakeasy
 Rocket's Blast Comicollector

References

 Fantasy Advertiser at CLASSIC UK COMICS ZINES
 Fantasy Advertiser section of Dez Skinn's website

1965 establishments in the United Kingdom
British comics zines
Magazines about comics
Magazines established in 1965
Trident Comics titles
Websites about comics